Ali: An American Hero is an American television film which aired on August 31, 2000 on FOX. It chronicles portions of the career of heavyweight boxer Muhammad Ali, who is portrayed by David Ramsey.

Plot summary
Cassius Clay (David Ramsey), winner of the gold medal for boxing in the light heavyweight division at the 1960 Summer Olympics, rises in the professional ranks and defeats heavyweight boxing champion Sonny Liston in a stunning upset to capture the title in 1964. Controversy surrounds his decision to join the Nation of Islam, his name change from Cassius Clay to Muhammad Ali, his friendship with Malcolm X (Joe Morton), and his conscientious objection to the draft during the Vietnam War. Stripped of his title, he eventually recaptures it in 1974 in the so-called "Rumble in the Jungle"—an epic bout against George Foreman in Zaire.

Cast and crew
David Ramsey - Cassius Clay / Muhammad Ali
Clarence Williams III - Cassius Clay, Sr.
Vondie Curtis-Hall - Drew Bundini Brown
Joe Morton - Malcolm X
Martin Ferrero - Angelo Dundee
Aaron Meeks - Young Cassius Clay
Amani Gethers - Ernie Terrell
Antonio Fargas - Elijah Muhammad
Khalil Kain - Rudy Clay / Rahman Ali
Earl Boen - Howard Cosell
Joe Lala - Ferdie Pacheco
Marc Coddette - Sonny Liston

DVD
Ali: An American Hero was released on DVD on January 27, 2004.

References

External links 
 

Films about Muhammad Ali
2000 television films
2000 films
American biographical drama films
African-American biographical dramas
Films set in the 1960s
Films set in the 1970s
Drama films based on actual events
Sports films based on actual events
Fox network original films
2000 biographical drama films
Cultural depictions of Muhammad Ali
Cultural depictions of Malcolm X
American drama television films
Films directed by Leon Ichaso
2000s English-language films
2000s American films